Florence Coffey (10 June 1920 – 25 April 2014) was an Irish hurler who played as a centre-back for the Tipperary senior team.

Born in Boherlahen, County Tipperary, Coffey first arrived on the inter-county scene at the age of seventeen when he first linked up with the Tipperary minor team before later joining the junior side. He made his senior debut during the 1943 championship. Coffey immediately became a regular member of the team and won two All-Ireland medals, one Munster medal and one National Hurling League medal.

As a member of the Munster inter-provincial team on a number of occasions, Coffey won one Railway Cup medal as a non-playing substitute. At club level he was a two-time Connacht medallist, firstly with Boherlahan–Dualla and later with Thurles Sarsfields.

Coffey retired from inter-county hurling following the conclusion of the 1953 championship.

Honours

Player

Boherlahan–Dualla
Tipperary Senior Hurling Championship (1): 1941

Thurles Sarsfields
Tipperary Senior Hurling Championship (1): 1952

Tipperary
All-Ireland Senior Hurling Championship (2): 1945, 1949
Munster Senior Hurling Championship (1): 1945
National Hurling League (1): 1948-49

Munster
Railway Cup (1): 1946 (sub)

References

1920 births
2014 deaths
Boherlahan-Dualla hurlers
Thurles Sarsfields hurlers
Tipperary inter-county hurlers
Munster inter-provincial hurlers
All-Ireland Senior Hurling Championship winners